Angeliki Tefani  (born 8 June 1982) is a former Greek footballer who played as a forward. She played for Greece  at the 2004 Summer Olympics. At club level she played for Ifestos Peristeriou.

See also
 Greece at the 2004 Summer Olympics

References

External links
 
FIFA.com
http://www.ussoccer.com/stories/2014/03/17/11/36/u-s-olympic-womens-soccer-team-kicks-off-against-greece-tomorrow
http://floridagators.com/news/2004/8/11/7258.aspx

1982 births
Living people
Greek women's footballers
Place of birth missing (living people)
Footballers at the 2004 Summer Olympics
Olympic footballers of Greece
Women's association football forwards
Greece women's international footballers